The A 2 is an A-Grade road in Sri Lanka. It connects Colombo and Wellawaya via Kalutara, Galle, Matara and Hambantota.

Route

Colombo to Galle 
The west-coast portion of the highway consists of the Galle Road.  Within Colombo, the A2 serves as a north–south backbone to the city.  It is split into two one-way streets from Colombo Fort to Wellawatte, in order to ease traffic flow.

The highway passes through Wellawatte, Ratmalana, Kalutara, Wadduwa, Maggona, Beruwala, Bentota, Panadura, Kosgoda, Ambalangoda, Hikkaduwa, and Galle.  At Galle, the highway runs through the city centre before continuing towards Hambantota.

Galle to Hambantota 
From Galle, the highway continues east along the south coast towards Ahangama.  It passes Unawatuna, Koggala, Ahangama and Weligama, before arriving at Matara.  At Matara, it passes the University of Ruhuna.  The highway continues towards Dikwella, Tangalle, Ambalantota, and Hambantota.  To cross the artificial harbour at Hambantota, a harbour-bypass road allows the A2 to continue to Wellawaya.

Hambantota to Wellawaya 
After the Hambantota Harbour, the A2 turns north and passes Weligatta, Tanamalwila, Kuda Oya and Teluulla before reaching Wellawaya.  At Wellawaya, it meets the A4 and A23 highways.

Asian Highways 
The A2 forms part of the Asian Highways route AH43.  AH43 is unsigned while on the A2.

See also 
 List of A-Grade highways in Sri Lanka
 E01 expressway (Sri Lanka), expressway built to reduce the traffic load on the A2.

References 
	

A02 highway